Several vessels have been named SS Doric. You may be looking for:

, a British ocean liner built by Harland and Wolff and operated by White Star Line.
, a second British ocean liner operated by White Star Line.
, an ocean liner/cruise ship built operated by ZIM Lines, Israel for transatlantic service from Haifa to New York.

Ship names